Edward N. Whitson (October 6, 1852 – October 15, 1910) was a United States district judge of the United States District Court for the Eastern District of Washington.

Education and career

Born in Linn County, Oregon Territory, (now Oregon) (some sources say Salem, in Marion County, Oregon Territory), Whitson was an auditor in Yakima County, Washington Territory (State of Washington from November 11, 1889) from 1875 to 1876, and a member of the Washington Territorial Legislature from 1877 to 1878. He read law to enter the bar in 1879, and was Mayor of North Yakima (now Yakima), Washington Territory from 1886 to 1888, also maintaining a private practice.

Federal judicial service

On March 10, 1905, Whitson was nominated by President Theodore Roosevelt to a new seat on the United States District Court for the Eastern District of Washington created by 33 Stat. 824. He was confirmed by the United States Senate on March 14, 1905, and received his commission the same day. Whitson served in that capacity until his death on October 15, 1910, after suffering attacks of paralysis.

References

Sources

External links
 

1852 births
1910 deaths
Judges of the United States District Court for the Eastern District of Washington
United States district court judges appointed by Theodore Roosevelt
20th-century American judges
People from Linn County, Oregon
Members of the Washington Territorial Legislature
19th-century American politicians
United States federal judges admitted to the practice of law by reading law
19th-century American judges